Clinker may refer to:

 Cement clinker, a kilned then quenched cement product
Clinker (boat building), construction method for wooden boats
Clinker (waste), waste from industrial processes, particularly coal burning
Clinkers (album), a 1978 album by saxophonist Steve Lacy
Clinker brick, rough dark-coloured bricks
Clinker Peak, a volcanic peak in British Columbia, Canada
Clinker Ridge, a mountain ridge in British Columbia. Canada
Gary James Joynes, a.k.a. Clinker
Mount Price (British Columbia), formerly known as Clinker Mountain

Clinker may also refer to:
Small rocks that form in some ʻAʻā lava flows
Waste from coal-seam fires

Surname 

 Cletus Clinker (1911–1979), American football player and coach
Humphry Clinker, title character of Tobias Smollett's 1771 novel The Expedition of Humphry Clinker